The 2011–12 Welsh Premier League is the third season of the Women's Welsh Premier League, Wales' premier football league. Northop Hall Girls replaced Llandudno Junction Ladies in the Northern Conference.

The season kicked off on Sunday, 25 September 2011, with the final being played on 13 May 2012. It was the last season to feature a championship final, following the introduction of a 12-team league from the 2012–13 season. As a result of that, no team was relegated this year.

Clubs

Northern conference

Southern conference

Standings

Championship final
The third (and final, due to league restructuring for 2012-13) Championship Final is the first to not include either Swansea City or Caernarfon Town. UWIC won the championship final against Wrexham and will represent Wales in the 2012–13 UEFA Women's Champions League.

References

External links
welshpremier.com
League at uefa.com
welsh-premier.com
Unofficial website

Welsh Premier Women's Football League seasons
Welsh Premier League (Women)
Women
1